Kosogor is a rural locality (a village) in Kudymkarsky District, Perm Krai, Russia. The population was 15 as of 2010.

Geography 
It is located 31 km north-west from Kudymkar.

References 

Rural localities in Kudymkarsky District